is a passenger railway station in the city of Naka, Ibaraki, Japan operated by East Japan Railway Company (JR East).

Lines
Naka-Sugaya Station is served by the Suigun Line, and is located 9.0 rail kilometers from the official starting point of the line at Mito Station.

Station layout
The station consists of one side platform serving traffic in both directions. There is no station building and the station is unattended.

History
Naka-Sugaya Station opened on September 1, 1935. The station was absorbed into the JR East network upon the privatization of the Japanese National Railways (JNR) on April 1, 1987.

Surrounding area
Naka-Sugaya Post Office

See also
List of railway stations in Japan

External links

  JR East Station information 

Railway stations in Ibaraki Prefecture
Suigun Line
Railway stations in Japan opened in 1935
Naka, Ibaraki